Margo Baumgarten Davis is a photographer, educator and author of several photographer's books.

Personal life
Margo was raised in Connecticut and has lived for over 30 years in Palo Alto, California. She attended Bennington College, spent time at the Sorbonne studying French literature, and graduated from University of California, Berkeley. It was at UC Berkeley where she met her first husband Gregson Davis and traveled frequently to his home country of Antigua. She has a daughter, Anika and a son, Julian.

Photography career
Davis has produced photography in Paris, Italy, Nigeria and in the Caribbean, and has done a significant amount of portraiture. Davis has photographed Saul Bellow, Maxine Kingston, Tillie Olsen, Ursula K. Le Guin, Diane Johnson, and Kay Boyle.

In Nigeria, Davis produced a number of photographs of the Fula people.

Davis has spent time lecturing at Stanford on photojournalism with the communications department. She has also taught photography at University of California, Berkeley, and University of California, Santa Cruz.

In 2017, Margo's book Antigua: Photographs 1967-1973 was published by Nazraeli Press. At interview, Margo said she produced the book after hearing interest expressed at an exhibit in Antigua.

Publications

References

External links
Official Website

Living people
People from Palo Alto, California
Stanford University faculty
American photographers
University of California, Berkeley alumni
1944 births